The third Aldea was a  of the Chilean Navy in service from 1928 to 1967, but temporarily reactivated in 1973 to participate in the coup d'etat, where she and Captain Prat were used to secure Federico Santa María Technical University. She was laid down in 1928 by Thornycroft, at Woolston, Hampshire, England. She was launched by Mrs. Berta Castro de Merino (mother of future admiral José Toribio Merino) in November 1928, and commissioned in July 1929.

Aldea was one of six vessels in its class to serve Chile. The class was ordered from the United Kingdom and delivered in 1928 and 1929. The ships could make , but their light build proved unsuitable for the harsh southern waters off Chile's coast.

References

External links
 Official description from the Chilean Navy 

 

Serrano-class destroyers
Ships built in Southampton
1928 ships
World War II destroyers of Chile